Zeeman is a lunar impact crater located on the far side of the Moon near its south pole. It is not directly visible from the Earth. To the northwest of Zeeman lies the crater Numerov. Southeast of the rim is the crater Ashbrook.

The outer rim of Zeeman is eroded somewhat irregularly, with considerable variation in width of the inner slopes. The crater Zeeman Y lies across the northern wall, reaching almost to the relatively flat interior floor. In the western rim is a small crater that joins a gash that runs down to the floor. The surface of the interior is pock-marked by many tiny craterlets, and worn crater features. There is a low central rise, offset to the southeast of the interior midpoint.

An unusual, (officially) unnamed massif is present in the northwest section of the rim, which rises about 4.0 km above adjacent parts of the rim and about 7.57 km above the crater floor. The formation of the massif does not appear to be explainable simply on the basis of the impact event that created the crater.

Satellite craters 

By convention these features are identified on lunar maps by placing the letter on the side of the crater midpoint that is closest to Zeeman.

References 

 
 
 
 
 
 
 
 
 
 
 
 

Impact craters on the Moon